TV Times was a weekly Australian magazine that began publication in Sydney in June 1958. It previewed upcoming television programs, published interviews with television personalities, and printed a full weekly program guide. It merged with rival TV Week in 1980.

References

1958 establishments in Australia
1980 disestablishments in Australia
ACP magazine titles
Weekly magazines published in Australia
Defunct magazines published in Australia
Listings magazines
Magazines established in 1958
Magazines disestablished in 1980
Magazines published in Sydney
Television in Australia
Television magazines